Surrogate alcohol is a term for any substance containing ethanol that is intentionally consumed by humans but is not meant for human consumption. Some definitions of the term also extend to illegally produced alcoholic beverages.

Consumption of such substances carries extreme health risks, both from the ethanol content and other more toxic substances that may be present. Users risk both acute poisoning from substances such as methanol, and chronic poisoning from substances such as lead.

Most people turn to these as a last resort either out of desperation, being underaged or being unable to afford consumable alcoholic beverages (with homeless alcoholics) or due to lack of access to drinking ethanol (for example with prison inmates and individuals in psychiatric wards).

Common surrogate alcohols 

Many alcoholic liquids contain alcohol but are not meant to be ingested in the same way as alcoholic beverages. Typical surrogate alcohols include:
Hand sanitizer
Mouthwash
Aftershave or cologne
Cooking wine
Cleaning fluids such as Windex
Extracts
Charcoal lighter fluid
Rubbing alcohol
Windshield washer fluid
Antifreeze
Denatured alcohol – ethanol rendered unfit to drink by mixing with methanol or bittering agents
Sterno
Moonshine and other homemade alcohols, including two or more of the above mixed together
Disinfectants
Liquid soap
Paint
Ethanol fuel

Dangers to health 
Most surrogate alcohols have very high alcoholic levels, some as high as 95%, and thus can lead to alcohol poisoning, along with other symptoms of alcohol intoxication such as vertigo, impaired coordination, balance and judgment, nausea, vomiting, blurred vision, and even long-term effects such as heart failure, stroke, and death.

Besides alcohol, there are many other toxic substances in surrogate alcohol such as hydrogen peroxide, antiseptics, ketones, as well as alcohols other than ethanol (drinking alcohol) such as isopropanol and methanol. Methanol, and to a far lesser extent isopropanol, is poisonous. The effect of other chemicals on health has not been adequately studied, and so the health risks are unclear. However, observations in countries with high consumption of surrogate alcohols, such as Russia, indicate that the impurities in the consumed drink lead to high mortality rates.

In December 2016, 78 people died from drinking surrogate alcohol in the Russian city of Irkutsk.

See also 
Harm reduction#Alcohol
Inhalant (marginalized individuals may also inhale gasoline or glue fumes)
List of methanol poisoning incidents

References

External links 
Bio-medicine.org
Boozenews.ca

Alcohol and health
Imitation foods